Adelaide United Women Football Club is an Australian professional women's soccer club based in Hindmarsh, Adelaide. The club was formed in 2008. 

The list encompasses the honours won by Adelaide United Women. The player records section itemises the club's leading goalscorers and those who have made the most appearances in first-team competitions.

All figures are correct as of the match played on 27 February 2020.

Player records

Appearances
 Most league appearances: Racheal Quigley, 66
 Youngest first-team player: Emily Condon, 15 years, 126 days (against Canberra United, W-League, 5 January 2014)
 Oldest first-team player: Kristy Moore, 37 years, 305 days (against Newcastle Jets, W-League, 29 November 2014)
 Most consecutive appearances: Georgia Campagnale, 41 (from 17 October 2015 to 1 December 2018)

Most appearances
Competitive matches only, includes appearances as substitute. Numbers in brackets indicate goals scored.

Goalscorers
 Most goals in a season: 9
 Adriana Jones (in the 2016–17 and 2018–19)
 Youngest goalscorer: Emily Condon, 15 years, 132 days
 Oldest goalscorer: Kristy Moore, 37 years 270 days

Top goalscorers
Competitive matches only. Numbers in brackets indicate appearances made

Managerial records

Club records

Matches

Firsts
 First match: Queensland Roar 4–1 Adelaide United, W-League, 25 October 2008
 First home match at Hindmarsh: Adelaide United 3–2 Newcastle Jets, W-League, 31 October 2008
 First home match at Marden Sports Complex: Adelaide United 3–1 Newcastle Jets, W-League, 10 November 2007

Record wins
 Record league win: 10–2 against Western Sydney Wanderers, W-League, 14 January 2017

Record defeats
 Record league defeat: 
 0–6 against Central Coast Mariners, W-League, 6 December 2008
 0–6 against Sydney FC, W-League, 11 November 2009
 0–6 against Central Coast Mariners, W-League, 14 November 2009
 1–7 against Newcastle Jets, W-League, 8 January 2011

Record consecutive results
 Record consecutive wins: 3
 from 19 October 2014 to 29 October 2014
 from 14 January 2017 to 29 January 2017
 Record consecutive league wins: 3
 from 19 October 2014 to 29 October 2014
 from 14 January 2017 to 29 January 2017
 Record consecutive defeats: 19, from 28 November 2009 to 10 December 2011
 Record consecutive league defeats: 19, from 28 November 2009 to 10 December 2011
 Record consecutive matches without a defeat: 7, from 2 February 2018 to 6 December 2018
 Record consecutive league matches without a defeat: 7, from 2 February 2018 to 6 December 2018
 Record consecutive matches without a win: 34, from 15 November 2008 to 10 December 2011
 Record consecutive league matches without a win: 34, from 15 November 2008 to 10 December 2011

Goals
 Most league goals scored in a season: 31 in 12 matches, W-League, 2016–17
 Fewest league goals scored in a season: 4 in 10 matches, W-League, 2010–11
 Most league goals conceded in a season: 40 in 12 matches, W-League, 2012–13
 Fewest league goals conceded in a season: 12 in 12 matches, W-League, 2015–16

Points
 Most points in a season: 18 in 12 matches, W-League, 2018–19
 Fewest points in a season: 0 in 10 matches, W-League, 2010–11

References
General
 

Australian soccer club statistics